Dominik Lechner (born 1 April 2005) is an Austrian professional footballer. He plays as an attacking midfielder for 2. Liga club Liefering.

Career
He started his career with the youth teams of SV Kuchl. In 2012 he came to FC Red Bull Salzburg youth. From 2019 on he was in the Red Bull Salzburg Academy. In July 2022 he debuted for FC Liefering when he came in in minute 65 for Zeteny Jano in the league match versus Young Violets Austria Wien.

International career
Lechner is a youth international for Austria, having played up to the Austria U18s.

References

External links
 

2005 births
Living people
People from Hallein
Austrian footballers
Austria youth international footballers
Association football midfielders
FC Liefering players
2. Liga (Austria) players